The Miss Missouri's Outstanding Teen competition is the pageant that selects the representative for the U.S. state of Missouri in the Miss America's Outstanding Teen pageant. Miss Missouri's Outstanding Teen pageant is often held the second weekend of June.

Mallory Sublette of Palmyra was crowned Miss Missouri's Outstanding Teen on June 17, 2022 at Missouri Military Academy in Mexico, Missouri. She competed at the Miss America's Outstanding Teen 2023 at the Hyatt Regency Dallas in Dallas, Texas on August 12, 2022 where she won the Non-finalist Interview award.

Results summary
The following is a visual summary of the past results of Miss Missouri's Outstanding Teen titleholders presented in the table below. The year in parentheses indicates year of the Miss America's Outstanding Teen competition in which the placement and/or award was garnered.

Placements
 3rd runners-up: Tess Mandoli (2014)
 4th runners-up: Sydnee Stottlemyre (2009), Shae Smith (2020)
 Top 8: Christina Stratton (2017)

Awards

Preliminary awards
 Preliminary Lifestyle and Fitness: Sydnee Stottlemyre (2009), Tess Mandoli (2014)
 Preliminary Talent: Shae Smith (2020)

Non-finalists awards
 Non-finalist Evening Wear/On Stage Question: McKensie Garber (2012)
 Non-finalist Interview Award: Mallory Sublette (2023)

Other awards
Children's Miracle Network (CMN) Miracle Maker Award: Shae Smith (2020)
 Overall Instrumental Talent: Ashley Whipple (2019)
 Scholastic Excellence: Lauren McCreight (2010)
 Teens in Action Award Winners: Ashley Whipple (2019)

Winners

References

External links
 Official website

Missouri
Missouri culture
Women in Missouri